North Middletown is an unincorporated community and census-designated place (CDP) within Middletown Township, in Monmouth County, New Jersey, United States. As of the 2010 United States Census, the CDP's population was 3,295.

East Keansburg was renamed North Middletown by municipal ordinance around 1988.

Geography
According to the United States Census Bureau, North Middletown had a total area of 0.434 square miles (1.124 km2), all of which was land.

Demographics

Census 2010

Census 2000
At the 2000 United States Census there were 3,165 people, 1,026 households and 819 families living in the CDP. The population density was 6,879.6 per square mile (2,656.6/km2). There were 1,099 housing units at an average density of 2,388.8/sq mi (922.4/km2). The racial makeup of the CDP was 94.79% White, 1.45% African American, 1.42% Asian, 0.03% Pacific Islander, 1.52% from other races, and 0.79% from two or more races. Hispanic or Latino people of any race were 5.37% of the population.	
There were 1,026 households, of which 45.8% had children under the age of 18 living with them, 57.8% were married couples living together, 16.4% had a female householder with no husband present, and 20.1% were non-families. 16.3% of all households were made up of individuals, and 6.9% had someone living alone who was 65 years of age or older. The average household size was 3.08 and the average family size was 3.44.

Age distribution was 31.0% under the age of 18, 9.0% from 18 to 24, 33.8% from 25 to 44, 18.7% from 45 to 64, and 7.6% who were 65 years of age or older. The median age was 32 years. For every 100 females, there were 94.6 males. For every 100 females age 18 and over, there were 91.0 males.

The median household income was $54,954, and the median family income was $60,893. Males had a median income of $49,120 versus $28,929 for females. The per capita income for the CDP was $20,462. About 4.6% of families and 6.3% of the population were below the poverty line, including 10.7% of those under age 18 and 12.6% of those age 65 or over.

Emergency services
North Middletown is served by East Keansburg Fire Co. and Middletown First Aid and Rescue Squad, both located in the CDP.

References

Census-designated places in Monmouth County, New Jersey
Middletown Township, New Jersey